Vitali Georgyevich Smirnov (born 14 February 1935 in Russian SFSR, USSR) is a former athlete from Russia. He was an active in swimming, water polo, tennis, and boxing, and he was a member of the USSR Masters' water polo team. Smirnov has published various articles on physical education, sport and Olympic issues. With 44-years of service in the International Olympic Committee (IOC), Vitali Smirnov is the second-longest serving member in the organization's history.

Education
Smirnov studied at the Academy of Physical Education and Sport, as well as at the University of Social Sciences in Moscow (Russian Federation).

Career
From 1970 to 1975 he was the First Vice-Minister of Sport of the USSR, and from 1981 to 1990, he was the Minister of Sport of the Russian Federation. He also had various other obligations throughout the years in sport and physical education organizations.

Sports administration
Vitali Smirnov was Executive President of the Organising Committee of the Games of the XXII Olympiad in Moscow in 1980 from 1975 until 1981. Then he was President of the USSR National Olympic Committee from 1990 to 1992. At the Russian National Olympic Committee he was President from 1992 to 2001, then Honorary President starting in 2001. He was a board member of the International Olympic Truce Foundation (IOTF) as of 2012.
Smirnov joined the IOC in 1971, becoming an IOC member, and was active in various commissions, serving in various capacities until 2015. He was a Member of the Executive Board from 1974 to 1978, the again from 1986 to 1990. He was in the position of Vice-President three different times, 1978 to 1982, 1990 to 1994, and 2001 to 2005. He was Chairman of the Eligibility Commission from 1992 to 1998. From 1972 to 1978, he was member of the Olympic Program commission, then he was Chair from 1983 to 1991. From 1973 to 1975, he was member of the Olympic Solidarity commission, then 1979 to 1982 member of the Tripartite commission. Smirnov was a member of the Council of the Olympic Order from 1978 to
1982, 1991 to 1995, and again from 2003 to 2004. From 1992 to 1994, he was a part of the preparation of the XII Olympic Congress – Congress of Unity. He waa a member of the International Relations commission from 2002 to 2015, then in 2002 he was part of the IOC 2000 Reform Follow-Up. From 2004 to 2005, he was member of the Remuneration Working Group. From 2006 to 2009, Smirnov was a member of the 2009 Congress, and from 2015 to 2016, he was a member of the Public Affairs and Social Development through Sport commission. Vitali Smirnov was appointed to oversee the Russian Anti-Doping Commission in 2016.

Honours and awards
 Olympic Order (2015)
 Jean Petitjean Medal from the International University Sports Federation (FISU)
 Order of Merit for the Fatherland;
1st class (30 January 2020) 
2nd class (19 April 2001) – for outstanding contribution to the development of physical culture and sports, high achievements in sports at the Games of the XXVII Olympiad in Sydney in 2000
3rd class (26 August 1996) – for services to the state and the great personal contribution to the development of national sport
4th class (22 April 2010) – for great contribution to the development of national sports and public activities
 Order of Honour (22 April 1994) – for high athletic achievement at the XVII Olympic Winter Games in 1994
 Order of the Red Banner of Labour (1985)
 Order of Friendship of Peoples (1980)
 Order of the Badge of Honour, three times (1966, 1970 and 1976)
 Gratitude of the President of the Russian Federation (6 August 2007) – for active participation in efforts to ensure the victory of the application of Sochi to host the XXII Winter Olympic and XI Paralympic Winter Games in 2014
 Order of the Polar Star (Yakutia, 3 July 2008) – for outstanding service to the Olympic movement and the national sport, a great contribution to the development of youth sports, and the establishment of an International Sports Games "Children of Asia" in the Republic of Sakha (Yakutia)
 Badge "For Services to Moscow" (14 February 2005) – for his great personal contribution to the international Olympic movement and sport in Moscow
 Badge "For Services to the Moscow Region" (21 March 2007)

References

External links 
 
 Olympic.ru 
 Peoples.ru 
 Flb.ru 

1935 births
Living people
International Olympic Committee members
Full Cavaliers of the Order "For Merit to the Fatherland"
Recipients of the Order of Honour (Russia)
Recipients of the Order of Friendship of Peoples
Presidents of the Russian Olympic Committee